Tengwang Ge Xu (Preface to the Prince Teng's Pavilion), full name Preface to a Farewell Feast Atop the Prince Teng's Pavilion in Autumn or Preface to Poems on the Prince of Teng's Pavilion, is a piece of literature by Wang Bo of the Tang dynasty. It is considered a founding piece of Tang Literature.

It is classified as Pianwen, which depends greatly on rhythm, somewhat like classical Chinese poetry, but does not have a restriction of how many characters should be in one sentence, and how many sentences in one paragraph. It is named after Pavilion of Prince Teng, a pavilion standing by the Gan River of Nanchang City, which was then called Hongzhou and is the capital of the current province of Jiangxi. It was first built in the early Tang dynasty.

Wáng Bó was on his way to Jiaozhi County, in present-day northern Vietnam, visiting his father, and encountered a grand banquet held there. It is acknowledged that he actually finished the work at the banquet. The author expressed his sadness at being unable to make use of his talent. In fact, he was drowned in the South China Sea not long after he finished this classic before he reached Vietnam to see his father.

...x170px|Wen Zhengming's calligraphy of Tengwang Ge Xu
Wen Zhengming's calligraphy of Tengwang Ge Xu

External links

Nanchang
Chinese classic texts